The Dominican Republic Volleyball League ( LIDOVOLI) was a professional volleyball league in Dominican Republic. The competitions are organized by the Dominican Republic Volleyball Confederation (Confederación Dominicana de Voleibol).

Men's League Champions

Women's League Champions

References

External links
 Official website of Dominican Republic Volleyball Confederation

League
Dominican Republic
2007 establishments in the Dominican Republic
Sports leagues established in 2007